The Black Chapel (German: Geheimaktion schwarze Kapelle) is a 1959 political thriller film directed by Ralph Habib and starring Dawn Addams, Peter van Eyck and Ernst Schröder. It is based on the novel Die schwarze Kapelle by Olav Herfeldt.  It is a co-production between West Germany, Italy (where the film is known as I sicari di Hitler) and France (where it was released with the title R.P.Z. appelle Berlin).

It was shot at the Spandau Studios in Berlin with location shooting in Rome. The film's sets were designed by the art directors Otto Erdmann and Beni Montresor.

Plot 
Europe, in the spring of 1940. After the lightning victory over Poland, Hitler's Wehrmacht drew up plans of attack for the overthrow of Western and Northern Europe. Several high-ranking officers fear that Hitler's excessive policy of conquest will ultimately plunge Germany into the abyss and therefore intend to contact Great Britain through diplomatic channels. After careful consideration, these officers from the management level of the Wehrmacht selected the journalist Robert Golder, who was critical of the regime, in order to establish contacts with the enemy. But also the other side in the form of Reichsführer SS Heinrich Himmler has not remained inactive and tries to dig the nest of resistance. Due to a warning from the waiter in his favorite pub, Golder barely escaped being arrested by the Gestapo but was subsequently overwhelmed and kidnapped. But it is not Himmler's henchmen who kidnapped Golder. Rather, it is the resistance group behind it who want to use Golder as a messenger. He is supposed to convey Hitler's plans for the upcoming campaign in the West to a person of trust in the Vatican so that countermeasures can be initiated in the affected countries. This is to prevent a further escalation of the war.

The plan of the opposing Wehrmacht officers is to be able to hold talks with the British and French after a planned overthrow of Hitler in order to conclude a separate peace. Robert Golder is sent to Rome with the secret plans for the western campaign to a respected member of the Catholic Church. Himmler cannot prevent Golder from leaving the empire for Italy with a forged passport. But he notifies his most loyal representative on-site, the senior SS-Mann Hoffmann. This brawny guy has set up a regime of terror in the Italian capital that is disgusted by the ally in the form of the Roman police prefect Ferrari. While Golder intends to visit his contact, the other side is not idle, because Golder's opponents still have an ace up their sleeve: the equally pretty and dangerous top agent Tilla Turner, who is assigned to the journalist on a secret mission. But opponents eventually become confidants when Golder and Tilla fall in love. Now both are in mortal danger...

Cast 
 Dawn Addams as Tilla Turner 
 Peter van Eyck as Robert Golder 
 Ernst Schröder as Julian Hoffmann 
 Werner Hinz as Generaloberst 
 Franco Fabrizi as Graf Emanuele Rossi 
 Werner Peters as Heinrich Himmler
 Rosy Mazzacurati as Gräfin Dodo Ventura 
 Herbert Wilk as Oberst Horster 
 Heinz Giese as Obergruppenführer Eichenberg 
 Günter Meisner as 1. Killer 
 Inken Deter as Elsa 
 Rolf Möbius as Adjutant 
 Marco Guglielmi as Pater Orlando 
 Maurice Marsac as Britischer Botschafter 
 Gino Cervi as Polizeipräfekt Ferrari

See also
Schwarze Kapelle
Red Orchestra

References

Bibliography
 Bergfelder, Tim & Bock, Hans-Michael. The Concise Cinegraph: Encyclopedia of German. Berghahn Books, 2009.
 Davidson, John & Hake, Sabine. Framing the Fifties: Cinema in a Divided Germany''. Berghahn Books, 2007.

External links

1959 films
1950s spy thriller films
Italian spy thriller films
French spy thriller films
German spy thriller films
Films directed by Ralph Habib
West German films
World War II spy films
Films about the German Resistance
Films set in Rome
Films based on German novels
Cultural depictions of Heinrich Himmler
UFA GmbH films
Films shot at Spandau Studios
1960s French films
1960s Italian films
1950s Italian films
1950s French films
1950s German films
1960s German films